Dorsal cutaneous nerve may refer to:

 Intermediate dorsal cutaneous nerve
 Lateral dorsal cutaneous nerve
 Medial dorsal cutaneous nerve